The 1984–85 Pittsburgh Panthers men's basketball team represented the University of Pittsburgh in the 1984–85 NCAA Division I men's basketball season. Led by head coach Roy Chipman, the Panthers finished with a record of 17–12. They received an at-large bid to the 1985 NCAA Division I men's basketball tournament where they lost in the first round to Louisiana Tech.

References

Pittsburgh Panthers men's basketball seasons
Pittsburgh
Pittsburgh
Pittsburgh Pan
Pittsburgh Pan